Robert W. Hebberd (October 31, 1857 - November 25, 1928) was the Commissioner of Charities of the New York State Board of Charities and superintendent of the Queensboro Society for the Prevention of Cruelty to Children. He aided in the formation of Coney Island Hospital.

Biography
He was born on October 31, 1857 to Gilbert Oliver Hebberd and Isabella Lenox. On November 29, 1882 in Seneca Falls, New York he married Harriet Metcalf. He died on November 25, 1928 at Jamaica Hospital of heart disease.

References

1857 births
1928 deaths
People from Seneca Falls, New York